Stewart Ranch, also known as Stewart-Hewlett Ranch, near Woodland, Utah in Wasatch and Summit counties, includes eight buildings which were separately listed on the National Register of Historic Places in 1985.  The former ranch is located off Utah State Route 35.  Some or all of the ranch is included in what is now the Diamond Bar X Ranch.

All but one of the buildings are in Wasatch County, east of the Provo River, across which lies Summit County.

William M. Stewart visited the valley in 1900 and purchased . The ranch was bought in 1931 by in-laws, the Hewletts, who built a dairy barn and otherwise made changes.

"Included among the eight buildings are the ranch homes of the four Stewart brothers who founded the ranch, the ranch
homes of the two Hewlett brothers, in-law relations of the Stewarts who purchased the ranch in 1931, the ranch foreman's house, and the dairy barn. There are a number of other structures and buildings on the ranch which are not included in the nomination because they either have been altered, constructed within the past 50 years, or lack significant historical associations."

"Stewart Ranch is located in Pine Valley, a small mountain valley on the western edge of the Uinta Mountains, approximately 60 miles east of Salt Lake City. The valley, which runs generally north and south, is two or three miles in length, several hundred yards wide, and consists of a combination of open meadow lands and forested areas. The North Fork of the Provo River runs the
length of the valley and converges with the South Fork at the southern end of the valley. Also extending the length of the valley is a dirt road which passes through a series of fences and gates that mark some of the current property lines."

"The eight significant buildings that are included in the Stewart Ranch Thematic Resources nomination are as follows:
Ethelbert White/William M. Stewart Ranch House (1890)
Barnard J. Stewart Ranch House (1911)
Samuel W. Stewart Ranch House (1913)
Charles B. Stewart Ranch House (1918)
Stewart Ranch Foreman's House (1929-30)
Lester F. Hewlett Ranch House (1912?)
Verner Hewlett Ranch House (1929-30)
Stewart-Hewlett Ranch Dairy Barn (1935)
There are three other houses on the ranch which, though not yet 50 years old, may be eligible for future nomination to the Register because they were constructed during the second and final period of the ranch's significance as a recreational ranch. They are listed below.
Isaac M. Stewart Summer Home (c. 1941)
Junius M. and Ruth Stewart Romney Summer Home (1946)
Harold F. and Madelyn Stewart Silver Summer Home (1946)"

Ethelbert White and William M. Stewart Ranch House

This is a one-story gabled log cabin built in 1890, probably by Ethelbert White. It was moved from its original location at the north end of the valley to the southern end, around 1932.

It was a home of Salt Lake City-based educator William M. Stewart, who served 25 years at the University of Utah, including assisting the rise of the Stewart School, which trained teachers.  William M. Stewart's main residence, the house at 1133 E. 300 South, Salt Lake City, is the house most associated with his life and career, and was still standing in 1985.  That SLC house was included as a contributing building in the University Neighborhood Historic District, NRHP-listed in 1995.

The listed area is less than one acre, and the reference number is 85001140.

Barnard J. Stewart Ranch House
	

This is a one-and-a-half-story log house built in 1911 in Craftsman, bungalow style.  It was designed by Barnard J. and Leonora Cannon Stewart, with Leonora insisting upon Victorian details, and it was built by Hyrum Jensen, a Salt Lake contractor early in his career.

These are two outhouses and a c.1928 woodhouse built from boards, windows and door of a c.1895 homesteader cabin which collapsed under weight of snow a year before.

Charles B. Stewart Ranch House
(#85001137)	Off State Route 35

Samuel W. Stewart Ranch House
(#85001138)	Off State Route 35

Stewart Ranch Foreman's House
(#85001135)	Off State Route 35

Stewart–Hewlett Ranch Dairy Barn

area = less than one acre
mpsub = Stewart Ranch TR
refnum = 85001139
The dairy barn was built in 1934.
This is a two-and-a-half-story wood frame barn with a gambrel roof, built upon a concrete foundation in 1934. It has vertical board and batten siding. Its original shingles were eventually replace by metal roofing. A large shed-roofed milking barn was added as a lean-to on the west side in 1941, but collapsed under heavy snowload in the 1950s or 1960s, and was replaced by a smaller lean-to later.

Lester F. and Margaret Stewart Hewlett Ranch House

Verner O. Hewlett Ranch House

Only one, out of eight here, shown in National Register of Historic Places listings in Summit County, Utah, which seems to be correct based on GeoGroup view of all eight's coordinates and the Provo River which makes the county border.

Built in 1929 by Frank Turnbull.  It is a variation on Bungalow architecture in style. 

One-and-a-half-story log house with gable wings cross-wings crosswings cross-wings.

References

Ranches in Utah
Dairy buildings in the United States
National Register of Historic Places in Summit County, Utah
National Register of Historic Places in Wasatch County, Utah
Buildings and structures completed in 1911
Buildings and structures completed in 1934
1902 establishments in Utah